Kathleen Staudt (born September 8, 1946) is a former professor of political science at the University of Texas at El Paso, where she held an endowed professorship for western hemispheric trade policy studies.  Her courses focused on topics such as public policy, borders, democracy, leadership and civic engagement, and women and politics. After retiring on September 1, 2017, she became Professor Emerita.

She has published journal articles, book chapters, and complete books. These primarily focus on border studies, women/gender in international development, immigration, university-community partnership engagement, education, and violence. Nine of her eighteen books focus on the border between Mexico and the United States, including Violence and Activism at the Border (University of Texas Press, 2008).

Education
Staudt obtained her B.A. in political science at the University of Wisconsin–Milwaukee in 1971. She obtained a PhD in political science from the University of Wisconsin–Madison in 1976.

Career
Following the completion of her doctorate, Staudt moved to the University of Texas at El Paso in 1977. In the early 1980s, she was the coordinator of the Women's Studies Program there. Between 1998 and 2008, she founded and directed the Center for Civic Engagement. She has also worked extensively with the United Nations. This has included UNRISD on multilateral and bilateral technical assistance strategies to mainstream women, the UN Division for the Advancement of Women on "Technical Assistance and Mainstreaming Women" (1995) and "Equality in High-Level Political Decision Making" (1989), and the UN Development Programme, Background Paper, "Political Representation: Engendering Democracy" (1995).

Selected books
 Agricultural Policy Implementation. Kumarian Press, 1985.
 Women, Foreign Assistance, and Advocacy Administration. 1985.
 Managing Development: State, Society, and International Contexts. 1991.
 Political Science and Feminisms: Integration or Transformation? 1997.
 Free Trade?: Informal Economies at the U.S.-Mexico Border. Temple University Press. 1998.
 Policy, Politics and Gender: Women Gaining Ground. 1998.
 Fronteras No Mas: Toward Social Justice at the U.S.-Mexico Border. 2002.
 Violence and Activism at the Border: Gender, Fear, and Everyday Life in Ciudad Juárez. 2008.
 Courage, Resistance, and Women in Ciudad Juárez: Challenges to Militarization. Kathleen Staudt and Zulma Y. Mundez, 2015.
 Border Politics in a Global Era,, Kathleen Staudt, 2017. Rowman & Littlefield.

References

External links
 

American women political scientists
American political scientists
University of Texas at El Paso faculty
Living people
University of Wisconsin–Milwaukee alumni
University of Wisconsin–Madison College of Letters and Science alumni
1946 births
American women academics
21st-century American women